The World Future Society (WFS), founded in 1966, is an international community of futurists and future thinkers.

History 

Prominent members and contributors have included Ray Kurzweil, Peter Drucker, Carl Sagan, and Neil deGrasse Tyson.

Leadership

Current board chair & CEO 
Julie Friedman Steele: 2016–Present

Past presidents and executive directors 
Amy Zalman: 2014–2016

Timothy Mack, Esq.: 2004–2014

Edward Cornish: 1966–2004

Publications

The Futurist magazine 
The Futurist magazine was established in 1967, with Edward Cornish serving as the founding editor. From 1967 to 2015, it was a full-color bi-monthly magazine. Today, it is an online publication that reports on technological, societal, and public policy trends, along with topics related to the future of human purpose. The Futurist was nominated for a 2007 Utne Independent Press Award for Best Science and Technology Coverage.

World Future Review academic journal 
The World Future Society previously published the academic journal World Future Review. This journal was published independent from the World Future Society starting with Volume 8.

References

External links
 World Future Society (WFS) official website
 The Futurist magazine archives

Futures studies organizations
International organizations based in the United States
International scientific organizations
Magazines established in 1967
Magazines published in Maryland
Organizations established in 1966